During the Middle Ages, the counts of Blois were among the most powerful vassals of the King of France.

This title of nobility seems to have been created in 832 by Emperor Louis the Pious for Count William, the youngest son of Adrian, Count of Orléans. Over a few decades, the county was gathered to the royal lands of France until the end of the 9th century, before being relegated to the status of viscount.

From its second creation in 956 to the definitive integration to the Dukedom of Orleans in 1397, the county was directed by the last viscount's descendants, Theobald I. His descendants, called House of Blois ended up related to a large number of European noble families.

In 1397, the title was ceded by Count Guy II in the favor of Duke Louis I of Orléans, who was the second son of King Charles V. The very last hereditary count of Blois was his grandson, Duke Louis II, who annexed the county to the Crown lands of France when he was crowned King of France in 1498 under the name of Louis XII.

The title reappeared in 1626 when Duke Gaston of Orléans was offered a newly independent County of Blois from Orléans, but King Louis XIV refused this favor to his brother, Duke Philippe, when he received the traditional apanage in 1660.

Carolingian county (832–c.900)
It is likely, but not certain, that the title of count of Blois was granted before the year 832.

Viscounty (c.900–956)

House of Blois (956–1230)

House of Avesnes (1230–1241)
Title held by House of Avesnes.

House of Châtillon (1241–1397)
Title held by House of Châtillon.

House of Orléans (1397–1498, 1626–1660)
Even though the rights on the county were given to Duke Louis I of Orléans, Bloisian was not immediately integrated in the Crown's land. As a results, Dukes of Orléans also did hold the title of Count of Blois, until 1498 when Duke Louis II became King Louis XII.

On August 6, 1626, after a failed conspiracy in Nantes, Duke Gaston reluctantly accepted to marry the wealthy lady Duchess Marie of Montpensier, as Cardinal Richelieu wanted him to do. As a gift, he received the duchies of Orléans and of Chartres, plus the county of Blois.

When Gaston died, his Orléans-based apanage came back to the Crown. King Louis XIV decided to give it to his own younger brother, Duke Philippe, excepted Bloisian (and so the châteaux of Blois and Chambord) as well as Languedoc. Therefore, the county became definitively part of French territory.

References

Sources
 
 

 
Blois